The Sundowner is an American documentary short film directed by Steve Christolos and starring Jon Bendz and Tim Tomchak. It is the story of a civil engineer who builds a 53-foot yacht completely by himself, and tries to sail around the world.  The film premiered at Slamdance Film Festival in Park City, Utah on January 25, 2010. It was produced by Alan Wigley.

Premise
Unable to ignore the call of the ocean, a civil engineer builds his own fifty-three foot sailboat and sets sail, transforming his dream of life at sea into reality.  In jagged waters, he is in turn transformed from a man of hubris to a man of humility.

External links
 
 
 List of Slamdance Film Festival 2010 short documentaries

American short documentary films
2010 films
2010 short documentary films
Sailing films
Documentary films about water transport
2010s English-language films
2010s American films